Cornuodus is an extinct genus of conodonts.

References

External links 

 
 Cornuodus at fossilworks.org (retrieved 23 April 2016)

Conodont genera
Paleozoic life of Ontario